Papilio maackii, the alpine black swallowtail, is a butterfly of the family Papilionidae. It is found in Central Asia, Japan, China and South Korea.

The larvae feed on Zanthoxylum ailanthoides, Euodia meliaefolia, Orixa japonica and Phellodendron amurense.

Anatomy and morphology
The wingspan ranges from 12 to 14 cm. The body of P. maackii is black and dotted with some green scales. The forewings of males are black and speckled with many green scales. The underside of the wings are brown. The hindwings are black and speckled with blue and purple scales and have a tail. There is an eyespot on the side closest to the body. The underside of the hindwings are a darker brown and lined with red or orange spots. Females are more brightly colored and vibrant than males.

References

External links
Japan Times article on Papilio maackii, accessed 26 July 2010

Other reading

Erich Bauer and Thomas Frankenbach, 1998 Schmetterlinge der Erde, Butterflies of the World Part I (1), Papilionidae Papilionidae I: Papilio, Subgenus Achillides, Bhutanitis, Teinopalpus. Edited by  Erich Bauer and Thomas Frankenbach.  Keltern: Goecke & Evers; Canterbury: Hillside Books, 

maackii
Butterflies described in 1859